Abronia ochoterenai, Ochoterena's arboreal alligator lizard or Northern Chiapas arboreal alligator lizard, is a species of arboreal alligator lizard in the family Anguidae. The species, which is native to extreme southern Mexico, was described in 1939 by Rafael Martín del Campo.

Etymology
The specific name, ochoterenai, is in honor of Mexican biologist Isaac Ochoterena Mendieta.

Geographic range

Reproduction
A. ochoterenai is viviparous.

References

Further reading
Martín del Campo R (1939). "Contribución al conocimiento de los gerrhonoti mexicanos, con la presentación de una nueva forma ". Anales del Instituto de Biología, Universidad Autónoma de México 10: 853–861. (Gerrhonotus vasconcelosii ochoterenai, new subspecies). (in Spanish).

Abronia
Reptiles described in 1939
Endemic reptiles of Mexico